Marshal of Ireland may refer to:
 Earl Marshal of Ireland, medieval appointment, latterly ceremonial
 , early modern military appointment